Bikash Chowdhury (25 December 1932 – 1 August 2005) was an Indian politician who represented the Asansol constituency in West Bengal from 1998 till his death in 2005.

Prior to his being elected to the Lok Sabha, he was elected to the West Bengal state legislative assembly from Jamuria (Vidhan Sabha constituency) for four successive terms in 1991, 1987, 1982 and 1977.

References

External links
 Official biographical sketch in Parliament of India website

1932 births
Communist Party of India (Marxist) politicians from West Bengal
People from Asansol
2005 deaths
India MPs 2004–2009
Lok Sabha members from West Bengal
People from Saharsa district
India MPs 1998–1999
India MPs 1999–2004